The Division of Nepean was an Australian Electoral Division in the state of New South Wales. It was located in the western suburbs of Sydney. It originally covered the suburbs of Granville, Lithgow and Penrith. After the redistribution of 27 February 1913 it also included the suburb of Homebush.

The Division was named for the Nepean River, which itself was named after British politician Evan Nepean. It was proclaimed at the redistribution of 13 July 1906, and was first contested at the 1906 Federal election. It was abolished at the redistribution of 13 September 1922 and divided between six electorates:  Macquarie, Martin, Parramatta, Reid, Robertson and Werriwa.

Members

Election results

References

Former electoral divisions of Australia
Constituencies established in 1906
1906 establishments in Australia
Constituencies disestablished in 1922
1922 disestablishments in Australia